Freezing Water Number 7 (stylized as Freezing Water #7) was a stainless steel sculpture by Chinese artist Ren Jun. It was erected in Vancouver, British Columbia's Vanier Park in 2009, just prior to the 2010 Winter Olympics, for the 2009–2011 Vancouver Biennale. The installation marked Jun's North American debut.

In April 2011, The Georgia Straight reported that Freezing Water #7 was being re-installed in Richmond, British Columbia. A formal request was filed to extend the sculpture's temporary display in Vancouver for the 2014 Vancouver International Sculpture Biennale, along with two other works. Due to major erosion, the sculpture was disassembled in September 2014.

The sculpture is said to have a "vertical twin", Water #10, which is installed in Richmond.

See also
 2009 in art

References

External links

 
 

2009 establishments in British Columbia
2009 sculptures
2014 disestablishments in British Columbia
Destroyed sculptures
Outdoor sculptures in Vancouver
Works by Chinese people
Kitsilano